The bigscale logperch (Percina macrolepida) is a species of freshwater ray-finned fish, a darter from the subfamily Etheostomatinae, part of the family Percidae, which also contains the perches, ruffes and pikeperches. It is native to North America where it occurs in the Sabine River of Louisiana, the Red River of Oklahoma and Arkansas, and to the Rio Grande drainage of Texas, New Mexico, and Mexico. It is now widespread in the Arkansas River basin where it was likely introduced.  It was introduced to the Sacramento-San Joaquin River drainage in central California, and in reservoirs fed by the California Aqueduct where it is also widespread.

It prefers gravel runs and riffles of small to medium-sized rivers.  It is also found in rivers with low flow and can be abundant in impounded waters.

References

macrolepida
Bigscale logperch
Bigscale logperch